= Antalya Festival =

Annual festival in Antalya, Turkey

Antalya Festival is an annual festival that takes place for 18 days between 12 and 29 September in Antalya, Turkey, celebrating the city's culture.
